Aleka's Attic were an alternative folk/rock band from Gainesville, Florida, formed by River Phoenix and Josh Greenbaum in April 1987.

History
The original line up of Aleka's Attic included River as lead singer and played guitar; his younger sister Rain sang, but, contrary to many incorrect reports, did not play keyboards in the band (although she did play various percussion, such as tambourine); Tim Hankins played the viola; Josh McKay was the bass player; Josh Greenbaum, a friend of River's from Florida, was the drummer. Rain Phoenix would periodically attend a part of a rehearsal but officially joined about a year later. It is a common mistake that Rain started the band with River. Although she had sung along with River since they were young, she in fact, showed little interest during the first year or more of Aleka's Attic (prior to that name as well) when it was only River and Josh "Greene" (as he went by during that time) Greenbaum in the garage working on songs most of that first year plus.

About choosing the band's name, "Aleka's a fictional poet-philosopher who gathered friends in his attic to discuss his ideas, when Aleka dies they form a band to share his beliefs with others through music".

River was offered to sign a two-year development deal with Island Records to develop the band and record a marketable album, which was not accomplished in the time allotted due to River's ongoing film work schedule. So Island, retaining the option to continue or not, opted out of the deal based on the non-marketability of River's newer material. River then decided to record an album independently for the band.

The unreleased album
The release of the album, with the proposed titles Never Odd Or Even and Zero, was postponed due to River's death. Though Rain spent two years weeding through unfinished tracks and mixing what was a slew of performances, no finished product was ever completed. The reason is that there has been communication problems between the Phoenix family and former members Tim Hankins and Sasa Raphael. Josh Greenbaum and Josh Mckay had readily signed a release form allowing their tracks to be used, hence the early enthusiasm about the potential release of the record. According to Greenbaum, "The reason River signed with Island in the first place was because he obviously wanted to get his music out to the world.  I just want to see that happen, even if I never see a penny from it. That would make the investment of five years of my life worth it."

An original track list for bootlegs of Zero/Never Odd Or Even:

 Alone We Elope
 Below Beloved
 Bliss Is...
 Dog God
 Get Anything
 Note To A Friend
 Safety Pins and Army Boots
 Scales & Fishnails
 Senile Felines
 You're So Ostentatious

In 1997, Phoenix's friend Michael Stipe of R.E.M. bought the rights to all of Aleka's Attic's material from Island Records.

Homemade versions of an album and many other songs by the band can be found on various sites throughout the internet.

In the film Sneakers, whose cast includes Aleka's Attic member River Phoenix, the character played by Dan Aykroyd wears an Aleka's Attic T-shirt in one scene.

In December 2018, Rain Phoenix announced on Instagram that Aleka's Attic singles would be released in 2019 with the album being released eventually.

Red Hot Chili Peppers bassist Flea is appearing on two unreleased Aleka's Attic songs to mark River Phoenix's 50th birthday.

In July 2020, it was reported that Aleka's Attic heavily influenced a forthcoming novel by British novelist Guy Mankowski, entitled "Dead Rock Stars".

Released tracks
 The group sold tapes between 1989 and 1990 with the songs "Goldmine", "Too Many Colors", "Across The Way" and "Blue Period".
"Across The Way", which was written by River and Josh McKay, was included on the 1989 PETA benefit album, Tame Yourself.
"Note To A Friend", featuring River's friend Michael "Flea" Balzary of the Red Hot Chili Peppers on bass, was released on the 1996 compilation 'In Defense Of Animals: Volume II'
The song "Too Many Colors", was featured on the unreleased soundtrack of "My Own Private Idaho", a 1991 film starring River Phoenix and Keanu Reeves, directed by Gus Van Sant.
 The songs  "Where I’d Gone" and "Scales & Fishnails" were released on the album "Time Gone" by Rain Phoenix in 2019. Next to this the song "Time is the Killer" by Rain Phoenix and Michael Stipe was also released on the album.
 "Senile Felines" was published in 2010 on the album Tiny Idols Volume III by Snowglobe Records.
 The song  "In The Corner Dunce" was released in January 2019 by the label LaunchLeft.
 On August 23, 2020, the label LaunchLeft released the songs "Alone U Elope" and "2x4" in commemoration of River Phoenix's 50th birthday.

Other tracks
 Too Many Colors - 5:24
 Goldmine - 5:26
 Where I'd Gone - 3:17  (solo version by River Phoenix)
 Get Anything - 3:52
 Note to a Friend - 1:11
 Below Beloved - 3:56
 Popular Thinks (Live) - 2:13
 You're so Ostentatious - 2:42
 In The Corner Dunce - 3:41
 Scales and Fish-nails - 0:41
 Across the Way - 4:58
 Senile Felines - 4:40
 Safety Pins and Army Boots - 1:49
 Dog God - 3:28
 Bliss is... - 3:38  
 Blue Period - 5:15
 Alone we Elope (Hidden Track) - 3:14

References

External links

 Aleka's Attic Music at Myspace

Musical groups established in 1987
Alternative rock groups from Florida
Musical groups from Gainesville, Florida
American folk rock groups
1987 establishments in Florida
Sibling musical groups
Musical groups from Florida